Fernando Correa (born 10 February 1961) is a Venezuelan former cyclist. He competed in the individual road race event at the 1984 Summer Olympics.

References

External links
 

1961 births
Living people
Venezuelan male cyclists
Olympic cyclists of Venezuela
Cyclists at the 1984 Summer Olympics
Place of birth missing (living people)
Pan American Games medalists in cycling
20th-century Venezuelan people
Pan American Games bronze medalists for Venezuela
Medalists at the 1983 Pan American Games